Christopher Opoku (1974 - 2017) also known as Christopher Columbus was a Ghanaian sports journalist.

Early life 
Christopher was born to Mr. K.O. Opoku and Akose Ofori-Mensah in 1974. He attended Kwame Nkrumah University of Science and Technology (KNUST).

Career 
He started his career as a sports journalist at Luv fm, He also worked at Metro TV from 2009 to 2013, then he later moved to GTV and Citifm , Business and Financial Times, Happy Sports, worked with Footy-Ghana as Managing Editor, he did punditry for various stations like Multi TV and was the administrative director of Ghana League Club Association (GHALCA). Because of his command of the English language he covered the 2000 CAF Nations Cup and other tournaments.

Achievements 
He was named best commentator and sports journalist in 2008 and 2009.

Death 
He died at age forty-two and the cause of his death was cancer. He left behind a spouse and three daughters.

References 

1974 births
2017 deaths
Ghanaian sports journalists
Ghanaian radio journalists
Ghanaian television journalists